Oenospila flavifusata is a moth of the family Geometridae. It is found in Oriental tropics to Sundaland.

Generally a green colored moth. Costa whitish and dentate fasciae is dark. Caterpillar yellowish with a dorsal, slender, red double line. Head bifid. Pupation occurs in a cocoon made between two leaves spun together. Host plants include Anacardium, Barringtonia, Memecylon, Eugenia, Syzygium, Nephelium, Chrysophyllum, and recently caterpillars found from Garcinia xanthochymus.

One subspecies recognized.
Oenospila flavifusata moniliata Warren, 1912

References

Moths of Asia
Moths described in 1861